Kyriakos Pontikeas (born 9 May 1991) is a water polo player of Greece. As a member of the Greek team, he won the bronze medal at the 2015 World Aquatics Championships. 

He was a member of the team that competed for Greece at the 2016 Summer Olympics.  They finished in 6th place.

He plays for Greek powerhouse Olympiacos.

See also
 List of World Aquatics Championships medalists in water polo

References

External links
 

Greek male water polo players
Olympiacos Water Polo Club players
Living people
Place of birth missing (living people)
1991 births
World Aquatics Championships medalists in water polo
Olympic water polo players of Greece
Water polo players at the 2016 Summer Olympics
Mediterranean Games medalists in water polo
Mediterranean Games bronze medalists for Greece
Competitors at the 2013 Mediterranean Games
21st-century Greek people